Kivinu was the fifth original album by The Rabbis' Sons. It was released in 1996 – 22 years after their previous album of original music and 28 years after all of the original members last appeared together on the same album. The songs were first taught by Rabbi Chait at Maarava Machon Rubin during their Thursday night mishmar.

Track listing

References

 Kivinu at JewishMusic Stream
 Liner notes for Kivinu

1996 albums
Hasidic music
Jewish music albums